The Frederic Remington Art Museum is an art museum in Ogdensburg, New York, that focuses on the work of Frederic Remington.

History
The building currently housing the museum was built in 1810 by David Parish.  Although he only lived in the home until 1816, other members of his family occupied it up until the 1860s.  After Frederic Remington died in 1909, his wife Eva moved into the house as a guest of Frederic's friend George Hall in 1915 and lived there with her sister until her death in 1918.

Eva Remington's estate became the Remington Art Memorial in 1923.  Since then, the collection has expanded through purchases and donations, and it is now called the Frederic Remington Art Museum.

See also
 List of single-artist museums

Frederic Remington
Art museums established in 1923
American West museums
Museums of American art
Remington, Frederic
Museums in St. Lawrence County, New York
Art museums and galleries in New York (state)
1923 establishments in New York (state)
Remington